The Guishan Guanyin of the Thousand Hands and Eyes is located in Ningxiang, Hunan province, and is the fourth-tallest statue in China, and the sixth-tallest in the world, found at Miyin Temple, a Chan Buddhist temple. The Ningshan County Government, with the help of local business and religious organizations, invested 260 million yuan to complete its construction in 2009.

See also
 Miyin Temple
 List of tallest statues

References

External links
Images

2009 sculptures
Bronze sculptures in China
Cultural infrastructure completed in 2009
Buildings and structures in Hunan
Colossal Guanyin statues
Colossal statues in China
Outdoor sculptures in China
Tourist attractions in Changsha